Before You Say "I Do" (working title Then Again) is an American television movie directed by Paul Fox. It premiered on Hallmark Channel on February 14, 2009, and was released on DVD on May 4, 2010.

Plot
George Murray has been dating his girlfriend Jane Gardner for a while now, and is ready to propose. But Jane can't bring herself to marry again after her first husband Doug broke her heart by cheating on her with the wedding coordinator. Desperately in love, George wishes things were different: that he had met Jane before she married Doug, making her not so jaded. After a car accident, George finds himself exactly ten years back in time, just a few days before Doug and Jane's wedding. He goes to her work, which is at a building for the Don't Throw Away newspaper, and Jane "meets" him. George also gets revenge on a guy at work who took (his colleague) Harvey's plans and caused him not to get the promotion he'd been wanting. Jane's friend, Mary Brown, knows all about Doug cheating on Jane, but she can't bring herself to tell Jane. She and George talk about it and plan to get Jane to find out about Doug and the wedding coordinator. Mary wants Jane to go with George, since she despises Doug for cheating on her best friend. At Doug and Jane's wedding, Jane figures out about Doug and dumps him for George. They run off in his car, getting chased the whole time by Doug. They get into a minor crash and George wakes up ten years into the future from where he is. He and Jane are married and are celebrating their 10th anniversary with a renewal of their vows. Mary married George's friend, Harvey.

Cast
 David Sutcliffe as George Murray
 Jennifer Westfeldt as Jane Gardner
 Lauren Holly as Mary Brown
 Brad Borbridge as Harvey Blinton
 Jeff Roop as Doug
 John Boylan as Mr. Johnson
 Brandon Firla as Jack Harrington
 Roger Dunn as Sam Gardner
 Salvatore Antonio as Freddy
 Reagan Pasternak as Patty
 Jamie Bloch as Laurie
 London Angelis as Billy
 Arlene Mazerolle as Guest #1
 Lorry Ayers as Guest #2

External links
 
 Before You Say I Do at Hallmark Channel

References

2009 television films
2009 films
Hallmark Channel original films
Films about weddings
Films about time travel
Films directed by Paul Fox